is a Japanese female singer, signed under the Being Inc. label. She is well known as a "Ryouseirui" (両声類?, lit. "both voice types"), being able to sing both "male" and "female" voice types.

Career
VALSHE debuted as a Niconico singer in 2009. Occasionally her songs are made by the composer of Vocaloid, doriko. She is also known to be good friends with the illustrator of Niconico, Hakuseki, who does almost all of the artwork for VALSHE's albums and utattemita videos.

In the beginning of her career as a professional singer, VALSHE used to appear as an avatar illustration (drawn by Hakuseki) with blonde hair and blue eyes. Her first appearance as herself is on the cover of her 6th single, "Butterfly Core". She released her first music video showing her own face for the song "Butterfly Core" which was featured on her 4th album "V.D."

VALSHE had her first live concert "LIVE THE JOKER 2013" in the Akasaka Act Theater on November 30, 2013.

VALSHE voiced Hayato in the Japanese version of Fire Emblem Fates.

In August 2017 VALSHE will collaborate with Vocaloid Producer Doriko on his compilation album Doriko 10th anniversary tribute with the song Ame ka Yume.

Song appearances
VALSHE's second single "Jester" is the theme song of the PSP otome game Kannou Mukashibanashi and the ending theme of the TV variety show Akesaka Satomi no Aketere.
The song "Another Sky" on the single "Jester" was used in the Xbox 360 game Ever17 as the grand ending theme.
The song "Fragment" from her third single "Afflict" was the ending theme to the variety show Kiseki Taiken! Unbelievable.
Her fifth single "Blessing Card" is the second ending theme of the TV anime Tanken Driland 1000-nen no Mahou,
Her sixth single "Butterfly Core" is the 37th opening theme song of the anime Detective Conan.
Her ninth single "Lie to You" is used as the 49th ending theme of the anime Detective Conan.
Her tenth single "Montage" is used as the second opening theme song of the anime Nobunaga no Shinobi.
Her eleventh single "Lapis Lazuli" is used as the ending theme of the otome game Majestic☆Magical.

Discography

Singles

Digital-Exclusive Singles

Albums
Valuable Sheaves (March 24, 2010)

Storyteller (September 23, 2010)

PLAY THE JOKER (February 22, 2012)

V.D.(February 19, 2014)

Storyteller II ~The Age Limits~(September 24, 2014)

Jiroku・Kumonoito (June 24, 2015)

DISPLAY -Now&Best- (September 23, 2015)

RIOT (July 27, 2016)

WONDERFUL CURVE(August 23, 2017)

This Life, is Gorgeous (August 22, 2018)

See also
 Niconico
 Vocaloid
 Being Inc.
 5pb. Records
 J-pop Artists starting with V

References

External links
 Website
 Barutoku Radio
 5pb. Records Valshe

Japanese women pop singers
Japanese-language singers
Japanese pop musicians
Living people
Place of birth missing (living people)
1986 births
Being Inc. artists
21st-century Japanese singers
21st-century Japanese women singers
Utaite